Yegor Gennadievich Podomatsky (born November 22, 1976 in Rybinsk, Soviet Union, now Russia) is a Russian professional ice hockey goaltender. His first name is sometimes transliterated as Egor.

Awards
 RHL Rookie of the Year: 1996-1997
 Best RHL Goaltender of the Year : 1996-1997, 1997–1998, 2001–2002, 2002–2003

International play
Played for Russia in:
 1998 Ice Hockey World Championship
 1999 Ice Hockey World Championship
 1999 Baltica Cup
 2000 Ice Hockey World Championship
 2002 Ice Hockey World Championship (silver medal)
 2002 Winter Olympics (bronze medal)
 2003 Ice Hockey World Championship
 2003 Sweden Hockey Games

References

External links

1976 births
HC Lada Togliatti players
Ice hockey players at the 2002 Winter Olympics
Living people
Lokomotiv Yaroslavl players
Medalists at the 2002 Winter Olympics
Olympic bronze medalists for Russia
Olympic ice hockey players of Russia
Olympic medalists in ice hockey
People from Rybinsk
Russian ice hockey goaltenders
Sportspeople from Yaroslavl Oblast